Cymindis kiritshenkoi is a species of ground beetle in the subfamily Harpalinae. It was described by Emetz & Kryzhanovskij in 1973.

References

kiritshenkoi
Beetles described in 1973